The Spanish word ranchería, or rancherío, refers to a small, rural settlement. In the Americas the term was applied to native villages or bunkhouses. Anglo-Americans adopted the term with both these meanings, usually to designate the residential area of a rancho in the American Southwest, housing aboriginal ranch hands and their families. The term is still used in other parts of Spanish America; for example, the Wayuu tribes in northern Colombia call their villages rancherías.

The Columbia Encyclopedia describes it as:
a type of communal settlement formerly characteristic of the Yaqui Indians of Sonora, Tepehuanes of Durango, Mexico, and of various small Native American groups of the Southwestern U.S., especially in California. These clusters of dwellings were less permanent than the pueblos (see Pueblo) but more so than the camps of the migratory Native Americans.
The term could be applied to the settlements of the California Mission Indians beyond the Spanish missions, such as Maugna of the Tongva people.

History
In California, the term refers to a total of 59 Indian settlements established by the U.S. government, 54 of them between 1906 and 1934, for the survivors of the aboriginal population. San Diego State University maintains a reference titled California Indians and Their Reservations: An Online Dictionary.  It says:
 

The word migrated north with the 49ers to the Fraser Canyon Gold Rush in an adapted form, "rancherie". It survives in British Columbia as a somewhat archaic but still commonly used word, in rural areas and small towns, as well as in general First Nations English usage, meaning the residential area of an Indian reserve.  It especially means the historical residential area, as opposed to newer subdivisions.  It was further extended to refer to other non-white residential communities, such as the Kanaka Rancherie in early Vancouver, British Columbia, which came to house the city's Kanaka (Hawaiian) residents. In an even more truncated form, the Ranche was used to refer to the Tlingit portion of Sitka, Alaska.

See also
Indian colony
Indian reserve, Canada
Indian reservation
Rancherie, Canada
Ranchos of California

References

Indigenous peoples of California topics
Former populated places in California
Mexican California
Native American populated places
American Indian reservations
Aboriginal title in the United States
Lands inhabited by indigenous peoples